Heather Rose Jones is an American author of fantasy novels. She received the 2017 Gaylactic Spectrum Award for her novel Mother of Souls, the third novel in her Alpennia series. Previous novels in her Alpennia series, Daughter of Mystery and The Mystic Marriage, were both finalists for the Spectrum Award. Jones published the book Baby Names for Dummies, part of the For Dummies series of instructional manuals, under the pseudonym Margaret Rose.

Jones received a PhD in Linguistics from the University of California, Berkeley.

Since August 2016, Jones has presented the Lesbian Historic Motif Podcast subseries of the Lesbian Talk Show.

References

External links 
 Index of Episodes: Lesbian Historic Motif Podcast

Living people
Women science fiction and fantasy writers
American lesbian writers
21st-century American novelists
American women novelists
American fantasy writers
American LGBT novelists
21st-century American women writers
Year of birth missing (living people)